The Chevrolet Malibu is a mid-size car manufactured and marketed by Chevrolet from 1964 to 1983 and again since 1997. The Malibu began as a trim-level of the Chevrolet Chevelle, becoming its own model line in 1978. Originally a rear-wheel drive intermediate, GM revived the Malibu nameplate as a front-wheel-drive car in 1997.

Named after the coastal community of Malibu, California, the Malibu was marketed primarily in North America, with the eighth generation introduced globally. With the discontinuation of the compact Cruze in March 2019, the full-size Impala in March 2020 and the subcompact Sonic in October 2020, the Malibu is currently the only sedan offered by Chevrolet in the U.S. It will be discontinued at the end of the 2025 model year.



First generation (Chevelle Malibu, 1964)

The first Malibu was a top-line subseries of the mid-sized Chevrolet Chevelle from 1964 to 1972. Malibus were generally available in a full range of bodystyles including a four-door sedan, two-door Sport Coupe hardtop, convertible and two-seat station wagon. Interiors were more lavish than lesser Chevelle 300 and 300 Deluxe models thanks to patterned cloth and vinyl upholstery (all-vinyl in convertibles and station wagons), deep-twist carpeting, deluxe steering wheel and other items.

For 1965, Malibus and other Chevelles received new grilles and revised tail sections and had the exhaust pipes replaced but carried over the same basic styling and bodystyles from 1964. The Malibu and Malibu SS models continued as before with the SS featuring a blacked-out grille and special wheelcovers. Top engine option was now a   V8.  201 of the 1965 Malibu SS cars got Regular Production Option (RPO) Z16, which include a heavily modified chassis and Chevy's new 375 horsepower 396 cubic inch V8.  All were hardtops, although rumors persist that one convertible was built.

The Malibu SS was replaced in 1966 by a new Chevelle SS-396 series that included a big-block  V8 engine (Canadian market did not receive the SS396 but marketed the former Malibu SS nameplate until January 1967 when it was phased out), heavy duty suspension and other performance equipment. Other SS-396 equipment was similar to Malibu Sport Coupes and convertibles including an all-vinyl bench seat. Bucket seats and console with floor shift were now optional on the SS and for 1966 with the SS now denoting a car with a big-block engine, the bucket seats became a new option on the regular Malibu Sport Coupe and convertible, upon which any six-cylinder or small-block V8 could be ordered. Also new for 1966 was the Chevelle Malibu four-door Sport Sedan hardtop. Styling revisions on all 1966 Chevelles including more rounded styling similar to the full-sized Chevrolets with sail panels and tunneled rear windows featured on two-door hardtop coupes.

For 1967, the same assortment of bodystyles were continued with styling changes similar to all other Chevelles including a new grille and revised tail section with taillights that wrapped around to the side. New this year was a Chevelle Malibu Concours station wagon with simulated woodgrain exterior side panel trim. Front disc brakes were a new option along with a stereo 8-track tape player.

Second generation (Chevelle Malibu, 1968)

Malibus and all other Chevelles were completely restyled for 1968 with semi-fastback rooflines on two-door hardtops and wheelbases split to } on two-door models and 116 for four-door sedans and station wagons. Engine offerings included a new  V8 rated at  that replaced the  V8 that had served as the base V8 since the Chevelle's introduction in 1964. Inside was a new instrument panel featuring round gauges in square pods similar to what would appear in Camaros the following year. New for 1968 was the Concours luxury option for Malibu sedans and coupes that included upgraded cloth or vinyl bench seats, carpeted lower door panels, woodgrain trim on dash and door panels, a center console and floor shifter (only with the hardtop and convertible, which was shared with the SS396) and Concours nameplates. There was again a top-line Concours Estate wagon with simulated woodgrain trim that had the same interior and exterior appointments as the Malibu sedans.

New grilles and rear decks with revised taillights highlighted the 1969 Malibus and other Chevelles. Instrument panels were revised and front seat headrests were now standard equipment due to federal safety mandate. The ignition switch moved from the instrument panel to the steering column and also doubled as a steering wheel lock. GM's three-speed Turbo Hydra-Matic transmission, previously only offered on SS-396 Chevelles (RPO M40), was now available on all models with all engines (THM400s were used with the 396 while the THM350 (RPO M38) first introduced with the Camaro and Nova) was phased in with the small blocks optioned, including the six-cylinder and small-block V8s which in previous years were only available with the two-speed Powerglide. A police package Chevelle 300 (pillared 4 door sedan) was available for the 1969 model year which came with the L35 code 396 - it was built in few numbers when the Chrysler Corporation held the market for its law enforcement orders. Some 1964 and 1965 Chevelle 300s came with the BO7 police package but was powered with the inline six.

For 1970, the Malibu was initially the only series of Chevelle offered, aside from the SS-396 and new SS-454, as the low-line 300 and 300 Deluxe models were discontinued for the American market (it continued in Canada until 1972), which also eliminated the two-door pillared coupes from the Chevelle lineup – which were never included in the Malibu series. New grilles, rear decks with taillights moved into the bumper and revised Sport Coupe roofline highlighted this year's changes. At mid-year, the Malibu was rejoined by lower-line Chevelle models that were simply called the base Chevelle in both four-door sedans and two-door hardtops.

In 1971, Malibus and all other Chevelles got a new grille surrounded by single headlamps replacing the duals of previous years, and four round taillights similar to Camaros and Corvettes were located in the bumper. All engines were detuned to use lower-octane unleaded gasoline this year per GM corporate policy as a first step toward the catalytic converter-equipped cars planned for 1975 and later models which would require unleaded fuel.

Only new grilles highlighted the 1972 Malibu and other Chevelles. All bodystyles were carried over from 1971, but 1972 would be the final year for hardtops and convertibles as the redesigned Chevelles originally planned for this year, but delayed until 1973, would feature Colonnade styling with side pillars and frameless door windows. The 1972 Chevelle was also ordered with the police package which used RPO 9C1 (which became the default SEO (service option) code for subsequent Chevrolet PPV packages).

Third generation (Chevelle Malibu, 1973)

The Chevelle was redesigned for the 1973 model year. Models included the base Deluxe, mid-range Malibu & Malibu SS and the top-line Laguna.

For 1974, the Deluxe was dropped, and the Malibu became the entry-level Chevelle. The Laguna trim package was replaced with the Malibu Classic which used a stacked arrangement of four rectangular headlights and made its way to the dealers in the 1976 model year, offering the Chevrolet built inline six 250 CID as the base engine. The Laguna S-3 model was introduced to replace the SS, and continued through 1976.

Fourth generation (1978)

For the 1978 model year, the Malibu name, which had been the bestselling badge in the lineup, replaced the Chevelle name. This was Chevrolet's second downsized nameplate, following the lead of the 1977 Chevrolet Caprice and Impala. The new, more efficient platform was over a foot shorter and had shed  compared to previous versions, yet offered increased trunk space, leg room, and head room. Only two trim levels were offered - Malibu and Malibu Classic. The Malibu Classic Landau series had a two-tone paint job on the upper and lower body sections, and a vinyl top. This generation introduced the Chevrolet 90° V6 family of engines, with the 200 CID (3.3 L) V6 as the base engine for the all new 1978 Chevrolet Malibu, along with the 229 CID (3.8 L) V6 and the 305 CID (5.0 L) Chevy built V8 as options. The 200 and 229 engines were essentially a small block V-8, with one pair of cylinders lopped off. The front and rear bellhousing face were the same as the small V8. The 231 engine was a Buick product, and featured a front distributor.

Three bodystyles were produced (station wagon, sedan, and coupe), and the design was also used as the basis for the El Camino pickup truck with its own chassis. The sedan initially had a conservative six-window notchback roofline. This was in contrast to the unusual fastback rooflines adopted by Oldsmobile and Buick divisions which would later revert to a more formal pillar style. To increase rear seat hip room (and encourage more orders for the high-profit air conditioner), the windows in the rear doors of four-door sedans were fixed, while the wagons had small moveable vents. With the rear window regulators no longer required, Chevrolet was able to recess the door arm rests into the door cavity, resulting in a few extra inches of rear seat room. Customers complained about the lack of rear seat ventilation. No doubt this design contributed to the number of factory air conditioning units sold with the cars, to the benefit of General Motors and Chevrolet dealers. For the 1981 model year, sedans adopted a four-window profile and "formal" pillared upright roofline. The two-door coupe was last produced in this year, as the Monte Carlo assumed the market position held by the 2-door coupe. For 1982 the Malibu was facelifted with more squared-off front styling marked by quad headlights with long, thin turn signals beneath them. The look was very reminiscent of the also recently facelifted Chevrolet Caprice. For 1983, Malibus gained a block-style "Malibu" badge on the front fenders to replace the cursive-style script located on the rear quarter panels of previous model years.

The four-door Malibu was commonly used in fleet service, especially for law enforcement. After the Chevrolet Nova ceased production in 1979, the mid-sized 9C1 police version (not to be confused with the full-size Chevrolet Impala 9C1 which was also available) was transferred to the Malibu, filling a void for the mid-sized police patrol cars. A 9C1-equipped Malibu with an LT-1 Z-28 Camaro engine driven by E. Pierce Marshall placed 13th of 47 in the 1979 Cannonball Baker Sea-To-Shining-Sea Memorial Trophy Dash, better known as the Cannonball Run.

There was no factory Malibu SS option available on this generation. The SS only came in the El Camino.
The rare, and striking, 1980 Malibu M80 was a dealer package for only North and South Carolina. It was mostly aimed at NASCAR fans who regularly traveled to Darlington Raceway. To this day, the number actually produced is unknown; estimates place this around 1,901 cars. All M80s had to be white with dark blue bucket seats and center console interior. The base of the M80 was a two-door sport coupe equipped with the F41 Sport Suspension package and the normal V8 (140 hp) drive train. The M80 option added two dark blue skunk stripes on top and a lower door stripe with the M80 identification. The package also added front and rear spoilers and 1981 steel rally wheels (sourced from the 1980 Monte Carlo).

In Mexico, General Motors produced this generation in the Ramos Arizpe plant, which was sold during three years (1979 to 1981). Mexican versions came in three trim levels (Chevelle, Malibu and Malibu Classic) and two body styles (sedan and coupe) with the  I6 as basic engine and the   V8 as the optional; this engine was standard on Malibu Classic models during those three years. This was possible because the Mexican emissions regulations remained relatively free at the time.

Iraqi taxi
In 1981, General Motors of Canada (GMCL) produced a special order of 25,500 four-door Malibu sedans at their Oshawa plant for Saddam Hussein's Iraqi government. The deal was reportedly worth $100 million to GMCL. These special-order Malibus carried the unusual combination of GM's lowest-power carbureted V6 engine, the   unit and a three-speed manual transmission with floor shifter; air conditioning, heavy duty cooling system, AM/FM cassette deck, front bench seat, 200 km/h speedometer, tough tweed and vinyl upholstery, and 14-inch body-color steel wheels with small hubcaps.

Only 13,000 of these cars made it to Iraq, with the majority becoming taxis in Baghdad. The Iraqi government suddenly cancelled the order in 1982. The proffered excuse for the cancellation was dissatisfaction with the cars' quality, notably difficult shifting of the transmission—which GM traced to a clutch release issue that eventually required on-site retrofitting by a crew of Canadian technicians sent to Iraq. Later speculation was that the Iraqis backed out for financial reasons, due to their escalating hostilities with Iran requiring the immediate diversion of funds to support the Iraqi war effort. GMCL President Donald Hackworth was initially quoted as stating the company would try to sell the Malibus in other Middle East markets, but in the end the orphaned cars were all sold to the Canadian public at the greatly reduced price of about CA$6,800. Over the years, they have acquired a low-key celebrity status, sometimes being colloquially referred to as "Iraqibu".

NASCAR
The Malibu was an extensively used body style in NASCAR competition from 1973 to 1983. The Laguna S-3 variant, in particular, was successful during the 1975 through 1977 racing seasons, with Cale Yarborough winning 20 races in those years as well as winning the NASCAR championship one year. Because it was considered a limited edition model, NASCAR declared it ineligible for competition following the 1977 season, even though (given NASCARs three-year eligibility rule) it should have been allowed to run through 1979. Beginning in 1981, the downsized Malibu body style was eligible to run, but given its boxy shape, only one driver Dave Marcis ran it in 1981 and 1982, with one victory in a rain-shortened Richmond 400 at Richmond in 1982, the independent driver's last win.

Gallery

Engines
The base  V-6 engine for the 1978 Chevrolet Malibu developed just  with optional upgrade to a  V-6, or  V-8. The largest and most powerful option was the   V-8.

Year Model Available Engines
78 = 200 V6 (95 hp), 231 (3.8 L) V6 (105 hp), 305 V8 (140 hp), 350 V8 (165 hp)
79 = 200 V6 (95 hp), 231 (3.8 L) V6 (115 hp), 267 V8 (125 hp), 305 V8 (140 hp), 350 V8 (165 hp)
80 = 229 V6 (110 hp), 231 (3.8 L) V6 (110 hp), 267 V8 (115 hp), 305 V8 (140 hp), 350 V8 (170 hp)
81 = 229 V6 (110 hp), 231 (3.8 L) V6 (110 hp), 267 V8 (115 hp), 305 V8 (140 hp), 350 V8 (170 hp)
82 = 229 V6 (110 hp), 231 (3.8 L) V6 (110 hp), 4.3 L V6 Diesel (85 hp), 305 V8, 350 V8 Diesel (105 hp)
83 = 229 V6 (110 hp), 231 (3.8 L) V6 (110 hp), 4.3 L V6 Diesel (85 hp), 305 V8, 350 V8 Diesel (105 hp)

Production Figures:

G platform
Beginning in 1982, the Malibu shared GM's redesignated rear-wheel-drive G platform with cars like the Pontiac Grand Prix, Oldsmobile Cutlass Supreme and Buick Regal. The Malibu Classic was last marketed in 1982; Malibus were produced as four-door sedans and as station wagons until 1983, at which time it was fully replaced by the front-wheel-drive Chevrolet Celebrity. Although the sedan and wagon were phased out, the El Camino utility, which shared styling with the Malibu, remained in production until 1987.

Fifth generation (1997)

A new front-wheel drive Malibu was introduced for the 1997 model year on an extended wheelbase version of the GM N platform shared with the Buick Skylark, Oldsmobile Achieva, and Pontiac Grand Am, as a competitor to the Honda Accord and Toyota Camry which were the best sellers in the mid-size market. All N-body Malibus were produced at the Wilmington and Oklahoma City Assembly plants through 1999 and 2002 respectively; thereafter, production was moved to Lansing, Michigan. The Oldsmobile Cutlass was a rebadged, slightly more upscale version of the Malibu, produced through 1999. It was intended as a placeholder model to fill the gap left by the discontinuation of the aging Oldsmobile Cutlass Ciera before the all-new Alero arrived in 1999. The Malibu itself replaced the compact Chevrolet Corsica. Power came from a 2.4 L 150 hp (112 kW) I4 or 3.1 L 155 hp (116 kW) V6. The Malibu was Motor Trend magazine's Car of the Year for 1997; this was later criticized by Car and Driver in 2009, citing that the Malibu was insufficiently distinguishable in terms of performance or interior quality to warrant such praise in hindsight. Standard features included four-wheel ABS brakes, hydraulic engine mounts and air conditioning.

The 1997 to 1999 Malibus had a front grille with the Malibu logo in silver in the center; 2000 to 2003 models, and the Classic, had the blue Chevrolet emblem on the front grille. The 1997 to 2003 LS models were sometimes equipped with special gold-colored badges (the rear Malibu lettering and logo).

When a new Malibu was introduced on the Epsilon platform for 2004, the N-body Malibu was renamed Chevrolet Classic and remained in production for the 2004 and 2005 model years, being restricted to rental car companies and fleet orders with production ending in April 2005.

The 3.1 L V6 was updated in 2000 with a new power rating of 170 hp (127 kW), and the 2.4 L 4-cylinder was dropped after that year. However, a 4-cylinder was reintroduced in 2004 when the 2.2 L Ecotec was offered on the Classic. U.S. Environmental Protection Agency fuel mileage estimates for the 2.2 L Ecotec engine are -.

Engines

Malibu Cruiser
The February 2002 issue of HCI: Hot Compact & Imports magazine featured the Chevrolet Malibu Cruiser concept that GM Performance Division built for the SEMA show in 2001. Numerous interior modifications included a full-length custom center console, four black leather Sparco racing seats, and a Kenwood entertainment center (with radio, CD, DVD, TV, 10-disc changer and numerous amps and speakers). Exterior modifications included custom HID headlamps (both low and high beams), "Altezza" style taillights, and a custom bodykit.

Chevrolet produced the Cruiser as a concept only, never making it available for purchase. The intent was to attract younger buyers to the stock model and to demonstrate the viability of aftermarket modifications.

Sixth generation (2004)

The Malibu name was moved to GM's new Epsilon platform based on the 2002 Opel Vectra C for 2004. The Epsilon-based Malibu came in two bodystyles, a standard 4-door sedan and a 5-door Malibu Maxx hatchback (the first mid-size Chevrolet hatchback since the 1989 Chevrolet Corsica). The Malibu Maxx has a fixed glass roof panel over the rear seats with a retractable sunshade, and an optional glass panel sunroof over the front seats and was similar in execution to the Opel Signum, a large hatchback derived from the Vectra C.

Base power for the sedan came from a 2.2 L Ecotec L61 I4 producing 144 hp (108 kW). LS and LT trim sedans and Maxx models originally came with a 3.5 L 201 hp (149 kW) High Value LX9 V6. The SS sedan and Maxx models were powered by the 3.9 L  High Value LZ9 V6. For 2007, the LX9 was replaced with the LZ4 V6, which in the Malibu produced 217 hp (162 kW). This was the only engine available to private buyers in the 2008 Malibu Classic. The L61 Ecotec was also updated for the 2007 model year with many improvements. A remote starter was also available, which was introduced on several other GM vehicles for 2004.

The sixth generation of the Malibu initially debuted with a front fascia design featuring a wide grille split horizontally by a prominent chrome bar that ran the entire width of the car, shared ultimately cross-brand. For 2006, the chrome bar was removed, and the grille itself was made smaller. As with all cars across GM, the car also carried GM badges near the front doors.

The Malibu Maxx was discontinued after the 2007 model year, the Malibu sedan remained in production for the 2008 model year, known as the Malibu Classic. The cars themselves bear Malibu badges, unlike the past generation Classic. Three models were available: the V6-engined LT and LS, and a four-cylinder LS version. Only the V6-engined LT was available to private buyers, with the LS versions only built for fleet sales.

Engines

SS

Changes to differentiate the SS from the lower trims include three-spoke, leather wrapped steering wheel with SS badge, sport cloth and leather seats, side skirts, chrome tip exhausts, and more aggressive front and rear clips.

Seventh generation (2008)

The Malibu was extensively redesigned and re-engineered for model year 2008, with styling by Bryan Nesbitt. GM Vice Chairman Robert Lutz was determined to make the nameplate competitive with Japanese mid-size cars.

Trim levels were base (2008 only), LS, LT, Hybrid (2008 and 2009 only), and LTZ. The LTZ trim had clear brake light lenses with red LEDs, the balance of trim packages retaining red lenses with conventional brake lights.

The seventh generation Malibu uses a variant of the long-wheelbase Epsilon platform shared with the Saturn Aura, the Opel Signum, and Pontiac G6. It is assembled in Kansas City, Kansas. Overall, it is three inches (76 mm) longer, with a six inches (152 mm) longer wheelbase. The interior design was revised, with a selection of two-tone color combinations (brick and tan two-tone), telescoping steering wheel, higher-quality materials and a twin-cowl dash design. Drag (Cd) is at 0.33 for the LTZ.

Powertrain
The seventh generation Malibu offered these engine choices:

The 2.4 L I4 and 3.6 L V6 engine have aluminum blocks and heads, dual overhead cams, four valves per cylinder, twin balance shafts, and variable valve timing. The 3.5 L V6 has aluminum heads, an iron block, overhead valves, and limited variable valve timing. The 3.5 L V6 was offered as an upgrade for special-order fleet vehicles, to replace the Ecotec engine, and generally was not available for retail customers. The 3.5 L V6 was not available in the LTZ. The 3.5 L V6 with four-speed transmission has been the only drivetrain available in the 2008, 2009, and 2010 models in Israel. Partway through the 2008 model year, the 2.4 L Ecotec was offered with a six-speed automatic transmission to improve performance and fuel economy.

For 2009 models, the six-speed transmission mated to the 2.4 L 4-cylinder engine or the 217 horsepower 3.5 L V6 mated to the four-speed automatic were made available on the 1LT; the six-speed became standard on 2LT models the same year. The LS models were equipped with the four-speed transmission only. A manual transmission was not offered. All models are front-wheel-drive sedans. Chevrolet dropped the Malibu MAXX station wagon model.

Partway through the 2010 model year, the GM badges were removed from the front doors.

OnStar was included on all Malibu models as standard equipment (excluding fleet vehicles, where this feature is optional). Six air bags were also standard on the seventh generation Malibu; two dual-stage front bags, two side-impact curtain air bags protecting the heads of both front and rear passengers, and two side-impact thorax bags mounted in the front seats. Traction control, electronic tire pressure monitoring system, four-wheel disc brakes, antilock brakes, and daytime running lamps were standard included safety features on all Malibus. GM's StabiliTrak brand electronic stability control was standard on all models including the very base LS model.

In 2011, the base LS 1LS Malibu gained more standard features, like Bluetooth technology with stereo audio playback capability, a remote USB and iPod/iPhone port, remote start, a security alarm, an upgraded OnStar system, power front driver's seat, chrome hubcap wheel covers, body-colored side mirrors with power adjustments and body-colored accents, a single wood dashboard accent, tinted windows, and a six-speed automatic transmission with overdrive and manual shift capabilities. The LT 1LT model lost its available eight-speaker Bose premium sound system. The LT 2LT got a package that included a sunroof, leather power heated seats, and more convenience and comfort features.
For 2011, the four-speed automatic transmission was dropped from the Malibu powertrain lineup. This same model year also saw the deletion of the steering wheel mounted paddle shifters on 6AT cars in favor of a selector mounted rocker switch for manual operation; no reason was ever given for the change.

Hybrid version
A BAS mild hybrid, with the base inline-4 like the Saturn Aura Green Line, was available offering an increased fuel economy of /, which for the 2009 model was increased to /. The Malibu hybrid was dropped for the 2010 model year for regular consumers but was still available to fleets.

Reception
The 2008 Malibu received critical praise from the automotive press, with The New York Times referring to it as being "like a super Accord, but from GM" and Car and Driver magazine declaring, "Camry, Beware." It also garnered high praise from Motor Trend magazine, being rated higher than the Honda Accord and Nissan Altima in the magazine's 2008 Car of The Year competition. Kelley Blue Book named it the "2008 best redesigned vehicle". Car and Driver stated that while it would not be "enough to steal the top-dog sales title from the perennial Honda and Toyota mid-sizers", they noted "for the first time since Chevrolet revived the storied nameplate in 1997, it has enough of what it needs to sell in significant numbers to the public, not just rental fleets".

Edmunds.com praised the Malibu's interior and exterior styling, quietness, and balance between ride and handling, while criticizing the thick C-pillars that obstruct the driver's view, the narrower chassis compared to other midsize cars (which reduces rear seating room and also lacks a center armrest) and lack of features such as dual-zone HVAC, Bluetooth compatibility, and keyless ignition.

While Robert Cumberford, design critic at Automobile magazine noted the interior of the platform-variant, the Saturn Aura featured cheap interior materials, he noted improved in the Malibu. Writers of various reviews for the 2008 Malibu believed Chevrolet would be getting back on track in quality and excitement in the mid-size segment after a history of ordinary, bland offerings, such as the Celebrity, Corsica, Lumina, and even the previous two generations of Malibu since its 1997 revival.

In January 2008, the redesigned Malibu received the North American Car of the Year award at the North American International Auto Show in Detroit in voting among a panel of 50 automotive journalists in a field of entries, with the runners up being the 2008 Cadillac CTS and the 2008 Honda Accord. The Malibu's win marked the second straight year a car built on GM's Epsilon platform won the North American COTY award with the 2007 North American COTY award having gone to the 2007 Saturn Aura.

Initial sales results were positive, with the Malibu joining the Cadillac CTS and Buick Enclave on a list of GM vehicles whose sales have exceeded expectations. The redesigned Malibu sold more than 50% more units in 2008 than in 2007, increasing GM's mid-size market share to 8.4% from 5.7%, while the Camry and Accord percentages remained flat at about 21% and 17.5%, according to GM. Sales to rental customers dropped to 27% of the total, as GM limited sales to rental fleets.

The short-lived Malibu Hybrid, along with its sister, the Saturn Aura Green Line, which share the powertrain and other major components, was particularly criticized due to its lack of fuel savings and cost (relative to a standard 4-cylinder Malibu), plus the Hybrid's worsened driving dynamics.

Recall
On September 21, 2012. General Motors recalled 473,841 vehicles involving the Chevrolet Malibu, Pontiac G6 and Saturn Aura from model years 2007 through 2010 equipped with four-speed automatic transmissions. The problem is a condition that could make cars roll when in park. The recall affected 426,240 in the United States, 40,029 in Canada and 7,572 in other markets.

Eighth generation (2013)

The 2013 Malibu moved to GM Epsilon II platform and debuted in Asia in late 2011, followed by North America in 2012. The new Malibu became a global vehicle, replacing both the North American Malibu and GM Korea vehicles previously sold around the world. The Malibu was unveiled as a show car simultaneously at Auto Shanghai in China (written as "迈锐宝", Mai-Rui-Bao ), and on Facebook, on April 18, 2011. It was also shown at the New York International Auto Show in New York City later in April.

The eighth generation Malibu was available in the trim levels LS 1LS (not available for fleet-ordered models), the LT 1LT (this is the base model for fleet-ordered models), the LT 2LT, the ECO 1SB, the ECO 2SA, and the LTZ 1LZ. Both ECO models officially went on sale in the spring of 2012, with the gas-only models following in late summer 2012. The Turbo models followed in early 2013.

All models, aside from the LS 1LS, were equipped with a large touch-screen display using Chevrolet's MyLink and offering Pandora Internet Radio playback capabilities via a USB cable and an iPhone 4, 4S, or 5. SiriusXM Travel Link was also included on all navigation-equipped Malibu models.

Markets

The eighth generation Malibu was sold in "nearly 100 countries on six continents". In the United States, it is manufactured in two plants, Fairfax, KS and Detroit-Hamtramck. In Australia and New Zealand, the South Korean-made Malibu replaced the Holden Epica, and made its debut in 2013 as the Holden Malibu. It was positioned between the Holden Cruze and Holden Commodore. In South Korea, the Malibu replaces the Daewoo Tosca, as GM has phased-out the Daewoo brand in favor of Chevrolet. Korea was the first market to get the Malibu, in late 2011, followed by China later in 2011 and North America beginning in early 2012. The Malibu made its Middle Eastern debut in 2012 replacing the Holden VE Commodore based Lumina. In Europe, the Malibu replaced the Chevrolet Epica. The facelifted Malibu was never sold in Europe. In the Philippines, the Malibu was introduced in late 2013 for the 2014 model year, where it replaced the Chevrolet Lumina, marking Chevrolet's return to the executive sedan segment since the Lumina was discontinued in the mid 2000s. The car was sold there until 2017, and was assembled in South Korea.

In North America, the eighth generation Malibu continued to be sold in 2016 as the Malibu Limited as the next generation went on sale. It was mostly identical to the 2015 model, but only featured the 2013 I4 engine variant (LCV instead of LKW) with auto stop-start.

In China, the eighth generation Malibu remained in production alongside the ninth generation Malibu until 2019. It received a facelift in 2016. A 1.5-liter turbo engine was added for the 2017 model year.

Powertrains

The eighth generation Malibu was offered with four-cylinder engines and six-speed automatic transmissions. The North American version was offered in 2.5L. The European version was offered with a 2.4 L Ecotec engine with an aluminum block and cylinder head, and a 2.0 L Diesel (1,956 cc) VCDi developing 160 PS (120 kW). The version offered in the Middle East had the 2.4 L Ecotec engine. Also available was a 3.0 L V6 engine making 260 PS and 290 Nm. In the Australian market two Holden-badged versions were offered, the CD and the CDX, with the 2.4 L Ecotec or 2.0 L diesel.

Engines

Safety
Standard safety features on the eighth generation Malibu include dual-stage front airbags for the driver and front passenger, along with pelvic/thorax side-impact and knee airbags up front also. Roof rail airbags with rollover protection are standard. Also available as option extras are second-row head/thorax side-impact airbags, lane departure warning system with forward collision alert and a rearview camera system.

The US-made Malibu in its most basic Latin American configuration with 10 airbags received 4 stars for adult occupants and 1 star for toddlers from Latin NCAP in 2013.

Reception
In a March 2012 comparison test by Car and Driver, the “light electrification" Chevrolet Malibu Eco hybrid came in sixth place out of six cars. The Eco is not a Malibu LS, LT, or LTZ. The Malibu Eco was criticized for its reduced wheelbase, causing a 0.8" reduction in legroom for back seat passengers. The interior was also criticized for being disappointing and cramped. The ride, however, was said to be smooth and quiet, with the only problem being the stiff steering.

The 2014 Chevrolet Malibu received the highest score in its class from J.D. Power's 2014 Initial Quality Study. The IQS study "examines problems experienced by vehicle owners during the first 90 days of ownership."

Updates

Eighteen months after the 2013 Malibu's debut, it received a mild refresh. The changes included additional technology, improved fuel economy, and front-end styling that more closely matched the refreshed Chevrolet Traverse and the newly redesigned Chevrolet Impala. Minor changes were made to the center console to deliver a longer armrest said to be more comfortable and a pair of cup holders and mobile-phone bins instead of the previous covered storage area. The Chinese model received a refreshed front end with revised headlamps.

Among the technology that Chevrolet debuted on the 2014 Malibu was a new six-speed transmission. Because the transmission was designed to reduce the energy required to pump transmission fluid, it contributed to fuel savings on the refreshed Malibu. In addition, for the first time in a non-hybrid GM vehicle, an engine stop/start system came standard with the 2.5 L engine. EPA fuel-economy estimates showed an improvement to 25/36 mpg city/highway, up from the 2013 model's 22/34 for the base 2.5 L engine. The 2014 Malibu went on sale in late 2013.

There has no change in South Korean market until 2016.

Ninth generation (2016)

On April 1, 2015, Chevrolet unveiled a redesigned Malibu at the 2015 New York International Auto Show, which went on sale in late 2015 as a 2016 model. The updated Malibu featured a sleeker, yet larger design similar to its full sized Impala. The wheelbase was increased almost four inches, creating more interior space; but the fuel efficiency is improved, as it is nearly 300 pounds lighter than the eighth generation model. The 2016 Malibu was offered in four trims: L, LS, LT, and Premier (replacing the LTZ trim).

The Malibu features an all-new, LFV Ecotec 1.5 L turbocharged engine that is standard, while a 2.0 L turbocharged engine is offered as an optional feature. No six-cylinder engine is available. Other new features on the ninth-generation Malibu that were introduced for the 2016 model year include available OnStar 4G LTE in-vehicle connectivity, as well as available wireless phone charging, preventive safety technologies including ten standard air bags featuring forward collision avoidance system rear cross traffic alerts, and an optional automatic parking assist. It features Forward Collision Alert with Following Distance Indicator, Adaptive Cruise Control with Front Automatic Braking, and Front Pedestrian Alert with last-second automatic braking. It is also installed with start-stop ignition once the engine is at operating temperature and the brake is applied while the vehicle is stopped.

The 2016 Malibu features a first for the automotive industry, a teen driver feature, which allows parents to view their kids' driving statistics, such as maximum speed, warning alerts and more. To operate the vehicle a parent enables the feature with a PIN in the settings menu of the Malibu's MyLink system, which allows them to register their teen's key fob. The system's settings are turned on only to registered key fobs. This technology also mutes the radio until the seat belts are buckled. The 2016 Malibu comes equipped with both Apple CarPlay and Android Auto Capability features. However, only one of their phone brands at any one time can be used.

A few months ahead of the 2016 model arriving in dealerships, Chevrolet announced that the Malibu had hit a milestone, with more than 10 million sold worldwide since the car was introduced 51 years earlier. China and South Korea are currently the only two countries outside of North America where the 2016 Malibu is sold, meanwhile the car was introduced in the Philippines in early 2018. No facelift model was introduced there until its discontinuation in 2021.

For the 2017 model year, the LT trim was no longer available with the up-level 2.0L EcoTec turbocharged Inline Four-Cylinder (I4) engine and nine-speed automatic transmission. 2017 Malibu buyers were now required to choose the range-topping Premier trim in order to opt for the larger engine and nine-speed automatic transmission.

Hybrid version

The ninth generation Malibu offers a full hybrid model for the first time, featuring a 1.8 L four-cylinder engine mated to a two-motor drive unit and electronically-controlled, continuously-variable automatic transaxle, providing additional power to assist the engine during acceleration for 182 horsepower of total system power. The Malibu Hybrid uses a transmission ("two motor drive unit" in GM terms) similar to the second generation Chevrolet Volt, but a much smaller battery, no plug-in option and a different engine. Due to the discontinuation of the Chevrolet Volt, the Malibu Hybrid was also discontinued after the 2019 model year.

The following table compares the fuel economy for all variants of the 2016 model year Malibu.

The Hybrid version is discontinued in 2020 due to decreasing sales, leaving Chevrolet without hybrid cars in their North American lineup. Their electric offering, the Bolt, is still on sale.

Engines

*NOTE:In the Chinese version of Chevrolet Malibu XL, a 2.5L Inline-4 cylinder engine was used in the 2016-2018 year range, in the 535T model, this engine produced 200hp. The same engine was used in Uzbekistan for a short time producing 186hp mated to a 6-speed automatic transmission. 

*Also have 2.4 basic engine

2019 mid-cycle refresh
Chevrolet updated the Malibu in 2018 for the 2019 model year.  A new larger front grille, split by a chrome bar with the Chevrolet bow-tie, dominates the front, while the rear change is less significant. The Premier trim adds LED headlamps while the L/LS/RS/LT/Hybrid trims maintain halogen headlamps. A new RS trim-line is added for a sportier appearance, with a black grille, unique 18-inch wheels, and dual exhaust. The touchscreen is replaced with the 8-inch Chevrolet Infotainment 3 in the L/LS/RS/LT trims and Chevrolet Infotainment 3 Plus with HD screen in the Hybrid and Premier trims. Heated Second Row Seats are added to the Premier trim. The standard 1.5 L engine is now paired with a CVT instead of the 6-speed automatic transmission. Safety features were also improved for the 2019 Malibu including Low Speed Forward Automatic Braking, IntelliBeam high-beam assist headlamps and a semi-automated parking system. For 2019, the LT trim's Leather Package loses the Bose premium audio system, requiring buyers to upgrade to the range-topping Premier trim in order to opt for the Bose system.

For the 2020 model year, the base L trim level received standard sixteen-inch aluminum-alloy wheels from the LS trim, replacing the previous sixteen-inch steel wheels with plastic covers. All trim levels received the eight-inch Chevrolet Infotainment 3 systems as standard equipment, and the previous seven-inch touchscreen unit was discontinued.

For the 2022 model year, the low-volume L trim was discontinued (as well as on all other Chevrolet vehicles that previously offered the L trim level), demoting the LS trim to base model status. The mechanical parking brake was also discontinued, replaced by an electronically-operated parking brake on all models. 

For the 2023 model year, the Premier trim was replaced by 2LT, and the leather seats for LT were discontinued.

Sales

References

External links

 
 
 CNN Money: Chevy Malibu Wins Car of the Year (2008)

1970s cars
1980s cars
1990s cars
2000s cars
2010s cars
2020s cars
Cars introduced in 1964
Malibu
Convertibles
Coupés
Front-wheel-drive vehicles
GM Korea vehicles
Mid-size cars
Motor vehicles manufactured in the United States
Police vehicles
Rear-wheel-drive vehicles
Sedans
Station wagons
Latin NCAP large family cars
Vehicles built in Lansing, Michigan
Vehicles with CVT transmission